Down by the Water may refer to:

 Down by the Water (PJ Harvey song)
 Down by the Water (The Decemberists song)
 Down By the Water (Amy Macdonald song)